Wooly Willy is a toy in which metal filings are moved about with a magnetic wand to add features to a cartoon face. The toy was originally manufactured in Smethport, Pennsylvania and was launched on the toy market in 1955. It remains in production as of 2016.

Funny Face, Betty Brunette, and Dapper Dan were similar toys.

The Woolly Willy trademark is currently held by the Beloit, Wisconsin-based company PlayMonster, formerly known as Patch Products, which purchased the Smethport Specialty Company in 2008.

Description

Creation
The artwork for the first Wooly Willy was created by artist Leonard Mackowski of Bradford, Pa. His signature is found hidden in the grass on the reverse side.

Launch
Priced at US$0.29, Wooly Willy was successfully launched on the market in 1955. A buyer for G. C. Murphy dime store chain initially purchased six dozen of the toy and expected not to sell them for a year. The buyer called Herzog just two days later and ordered 12,000 for nationwide distribution. F. W. Woolworth Company also distributed the toy. More than 75 million Wooly Willies have been sold.

Honors
Wooly Willy became a hit with young baby boomers, and remains in production as of 2010 by the Smethport Specialty Company, which is now owned by PlayMonster. PlayMonster was known as Patch Products until 2016.

References

External links
 

1950s toys
Products introduced in 1955
Magnetic devices
Toy brands
Smethport, Pennsylvania